Melchor Peredo (born 6 January 1927) is a Mexican muralist and a representative of the social realist school of mural painting in Mexico. His murals depict historical scenes from Mexican history with an emphasis on revolutionary subjects. His work is featured in public and government buildings across Mexico. He has also painted murals in the USA and Europe. He lives in Xalapa, Veracruz.

Early years
Oscar Melchor Peredo y Garcia was born 6 January 1927 in Mexico City. His father Luis G. Peredo was a journalist during the 1910 Mexican revolution and became a pioneer of Mexican cinema. In 1918 Luis G. Peredo directed the popular silent film "Santa" based on the 1903 naturalist novel by Federico Gamboa. At the age of eleven, Inspired by the work of muralists Diego Rivera, José Clemente Orozco and David Alfaro Siqueiros, Melchor decided to become a painter. He studied at several major art institutes in Mexico City including the Escuela La Esmeralda and the National School of Arts. He painted his first mural in 1947 in a maternity clinic, depicting the exploitation of marginalized workers in Mexico City.

In 1953, he joined the Frente Nacional de Artes Plásticas and was commissioned as a representative to assist at the IV World Youth Festival for Peace in Romania. The art critic Judith Krauss made arrangements for him to stay in Bucharest but he decided that the most important movement was in Mexico and returned home to join a research workshop funded by the National Polytechnic Institute. There he perfected his fresco technique under the guidance of José Gutierrez, a proponent of the first artistic use of acrylic paint./

List of Murals 
 Arribo al Mictlán, Maternidad Guadalupe, Los Reyes de la Paz, Estado de México, 1947
 Buceadores, Club Sirocco, Acapulco, Guerrero, 1950
 Resistencia Heroica (fresco-acrílico), Palacio de Justicia del Estado de Veracruz, Xalapa, Veracruz, 1980
 La Historia de la Cultura en Veracruz (segunda parte del mural del Palacio de Justicia de Veracruz), 1982
 6 murales en la Universidad de París XII, 1983
 Magisterio Heroico (fresco), Escuela de Bachilleres Constitución de 1917, Xalapa, Veracruz, 1991
 El Desembarco en Chalchihueyecan (acrílico), Escuela de Bachilleres Ilustre Instituto Veracruzano, Boca del Río, Veracruz, 1992
 Por una Humanidad sin Fronteras, Centro de idiomas de la Universidad Veracruzana, 2000
 Cultural Heritage (4 paneles al fresco), Harton Theatre, Southern Arkansas University, Magnolia, Southern Arkansas, EUA, 2000
 El Canto de Amalia, Museo de la Universidad de Sonora, Hermosillo, Sonora, 2000
 Human Diversity without war (óleo-resina), Hendrix Students Center, Clemson University Clemson, South Carolina, EUA, 2001
 Coatepec en la Cultura (acrílico), Palacio Municipal de Coatepec, Coatepec, Veracruz, 2002
 Una nueva raza abierta al porvenir (mosaico de talavera), La Antigua, Veracruz, 2004
 Homenaje a Ignacio de la Llave y La Reforma (fresco), Escalera del Palacio de Gobierno, Xalapa, Veracruz, 2004
 Una revolución continua (fresco), vestíbulo del Palacio de Gobierno, Xalapa, Veracruz, 2010

See also 
Mexican Muralism

References

Bibliography 
 Diccionario Enciclopédico de México
 Archivio documentale di arte contemporanee de la biennale di venezia, Venecia, Italia
 Archivo de Artes Plásticas del Cenidiap del Instituto Nacional de Bellas Artes..
 Krieg der wande (Guerra de Muros) de Michael Schwartz, Bonn, Germany, 1980.
 Las Artes Plásticas en Veracruz, Alberto Beltrán, Xalapa, Veracruz.

External links 
  Melchor Peredo murals at Palacio de Gobierno in Xalapa
 Melchor Peredo on the mural process - Imagen De Veracruz
 Melchor Peredo interview with Plumas Libres

Mexican muralists
1927 births
Living people
Mexican portrait painters
People from Mexico City
Escuela Nacional de Pintura, Escultura y Grabado "La Esmeralda" alumni
20th-century Mexican painters
Mexican male painters
21st-century Mexican painters
20th-century Mexican male artists
21st-century Mexican male artists